Dacryodes longifolia is a tree in the family Burseraceae. The specific epithet  is from the Latin meaning "long leaf".

Description
The bark is dark grey and smooth. The flowers are white.

Distribution and habitat
Dacryodes longifolia grows naturally in Sumatra, Peninsular Malaysia, Borneo and the Philippines. Its habitat is lowland to submontane forests from sea-level to  altitude.

References

longifolia
Trees of Sumatra
Trees of Peninsular Malaysia
Trees of Borneo
Trees of the Philippines
Plants described in 1932